St. Stanislaus Kostka School is a private Catholic primary and secondary school, located in the Prosperity district of Salamanca, in the autonomous community of Castile and León, Spain. The school was founded by the Society of Jesus in 1952. Nowadays it accommodates children from pre-school through secondary (ESO).

History 
The school traces its history to the efforts of various Jesuits to build a church and school in the Prosperity area of Salamanca, beginning in 1952. The church was completed in 1957 and it became a parish church in 1968. In 1995 St. Stanislaus Kostka School was in place.

See also

 Catholic Church in Spain
 Education in Spain
 List of Jesuit schools

References 

Jesuit secondary schools in Spain
Education in Castile and León
Educational institutions established in 1952
1952 establishments in Spain
Buildings and structures in Salamanca
Jesuit primary schools in Spain